Mountain Ash Railway Station (Welsh: Gorsaf Reilffordd Aberpennar) is a railway station serving the town of Mountain Ash in Rhondda Cynon Taf, Wales. It is located on the Aberdare branch of the Merthyr Line and on the banks of the Afon Cynon, a major river in the town of Mountain Ash.

Passenger services are provided by Transport for Wales and run to all Valley Lines destinations.

History
A station serving this area of the town was first opened at Oxford Street by the Taff Vale Railway in 1888. This was closed to passengers by the Western Region of British Railways in 1964. Passenger services were reinstated to a new station by British Rail in 1988. There is a passing loop situated here (constructed in 2002, when the station was also rebuilt), which allows a half-hourly service to operate and freight trains to operate alongside the passenger service on what is otherwise a single track route.

Services
The frequency drops to hourly in the evening,

On Sundays there is a general 2-hourly service to Barry Island with an hourly service in the morning and in the late afternoon. This is due to a campaign by the local Assembly Member and a successful trial in December 2017. The extra services began in April 2018.

References

External links

Railway stations in Rhondda Cynon Taf
DfT Category F2 stations
Railway stations opened by British Rail
Railway stations in Great Britain opened in 1988
Railway stations served by Transport for Wales Rail